Akkol District is a district (audan) of Aqmola Region in northern Kazakhstan. The administrative center of the district is the town of Akkol. The population at the time of the 2009 Kazakh Census was 28,359.

Communities 

Akkol (Administrative Center)
Azat
Bogembay
Kirovo
Kvartsitka
Minskoye
Stepnogorsk
Urupinka

References

Districts of Kazakhstan
Akmola Region